Troop may refer to the following:

Military and government
 Troop, a small unit of cavalry or some police forces
 "Support our troops", a popular slogan
 Troops, a collective term for soldiers

Entertainment
 Troop (band), an R&B group from Pasadena, California
 Troops (film), an independent spoof of COPS and Star Wars
 F Troop, a satirical American television sitcom
 The Troop, a TV sitcom
 Troop, a family name from Kipling's Captains Courageous
 The Troop (book), a novel by Nick Cutter
 Troop (Media powerhouse), CDMX Mexico

Other uses
 TrOOP, true out-of-pocket expenses (Medicare Part D Coverage)
 Troop (clothing brand), a 1980s hip hop clothing brand
 Scout troop, a unit of boy or girl scouts
 Troop, the collective noun for a social group of primates

See also 
 Trooper (disambiguation)